Count Claes Adolph Fleming (1771–1831) was a Swedish court official and diplomat, and member of the Swedish Academy.  He was the one of very few personal friends and confidants of king Gustav IV Adolf of Sweden, and according to Hedvig Elisabeth Charlotte of Holstein-Gottorp he was often courted by petitioners, but normally refused to make use of his influence.  He was given numerous diplomatic missions by the king, and accompanied him to Saint Petersburg in 1796.

References 

1771 births
1831 deaths
Swedish diplomats
19th-century Swedish nobility
Swedish courtiers
Members of the Swedish Academy
Swedish royal favourites
Knights of the Order of Charles XIII